Henricus comes is a species of moth of the family Tortricidae. It is found in Mexico (Veracruz) and the United States (Arizona and Texas).

The wingspan is about 16 mm. Adults have been recorded on wing in April and August.

Subspecies
Henricus comes comes
Henricus comes vicecomes Razowski & Becker, 1986 (Mexico: Veracruz)

References

Moths described in 1884
Henricus (moth)